János Nyisztor (18 December 1887 – 28 March 1924) was a Hungarian gymnast. He competed in the men's artistic individual all-around event at the 1908 Summer Olympics.

References

1887 births
1924 deaths
Hungarian male artistic gymnasts
Olympic gymnasts of Hungary
Gymnasts at the 1908 Summer Olympics
Gymnasts from Budapest